Missa cantata (Latin for "sung Mass") is a form of Tridentine Mass defined officially in 1960 as a sung Mass celebrated without sacred ministers, i.e., deacon and subdeacon.

Pre-1960 name 

Documents of the Holy See such as the Decree of the Congregation of Sacred Rites of 14 March 1906 spoke of Missa cantata sine Ministris (Sung/Chanted Mass without the Ministers). The 19th-century Ceremonial for the Use of the Catholic Churches in the United States of America (commonly called the "Baltimore Ceremonial" because published by request of the Third Plenary Council of Baltimore of 1884) used the name: High Mass without Deacon or Sub-Deacon

Classification 

The Baltimore Ceremonial thus classified the Missa cantata as a High Mass. The early 20th-century Catholic Encyclopedia said, on the contrary, that a Missa cantata "is really a low Mass, since the essence of high Mass is not the music but the deacon and subdeacon. Only in churches which have no ordained person except one priest, and in which high Mass is thus impossible, is it allowed to celebrate the Mass (on Sundays and feasts) with most of the adornment borrowed from high Mass, with singing and (generally) with incense."

In 1960, Pope John XXIII's Code of Rubrics distinguished the Missa cantata both from a high Mass and from low Mass. Under the number 271, it defined the forms of Mass as follows:

Ceremonial 

The Missa cantata came into use during the 18th century and was intended for use in non-Catholic countries where the services of a deacon or a subdeacon (or clergy to fill these parts in the ceremony of the Mass) were not easily had. It was intended to be used in place of Solemn Mass on Sundays and major feast days.

The use of incense at a Missa cantata was at first forbidden, but became general: "The Sacred Congregation of Rites has on several occasions (9 June 1884; 7 December 1888) forbidden the use of incense at a Missa Cantata; nevertheless, exceptions have been made for several dioceses, and the custom of using it is now generally tolerated." General permission was finally granted in the 1960 Code of Rubrics, which stated: "The incensations that are obligatory in Solemn Mass are permitted in every Missa Cantata".

The parts sung by the priest are to be sung in Gregorian chant. More elaborate musical settings of the choir's parts may also be used.

Current situation 

The rigid distinction between a sung Mass and a low Mass in the Roman Rite was abandoned in the 1969 revision of the Roman Missal. The General Instruction of the Roman Missal even states: "It is very appropriate that the priest sing those parts of the Eucharistic Prayer for which musical notation is provided." Under the heading "The Importance of Singing", it says: "Great importance should therefore be attached to the use of singing in the celebration of the Mass, with due consideration for the culture of the people and abilities of each liturgical assembly. Although it is not always necessary (e.g., in weekday Masses) to sing all the texts that are of themselves meant to be sung, every care should be taken that singing by the ministers and the people is not absent in celebrations that occur on Sundays and on holy days of obligation."

References

External links
Preparations for a Missa Cantata - Handbook for Sacristan by Rev. William O'Brien, 1932
article Liturgy of the Mass in Catholic Encyclopedia

Media
Videos of a Missa cantata with accompanying liturgical text
Video of a Missa Cantata offered on the Last Sunday after Pentecost at the Roman Catholic parish of St. Nicholas of Chardonnet in Paris, France (alternate host)
Video of a Votive Mass of the Blessed Virgin Mary offered as a Missa cantata at the Roman Catholic Priory of St. Pius X in Warsaw, Poland (alternate host)

Catholic liturgy
Latin religious words and phrases
Tridentine Mass
Anglican Eucharistic theology